Rich Gang: Tha Tour Pt. 1 is a mixtape by Birdman, Young Thug and Rich Homie Quan, as the group Rich Gang. It was released on September 29, 2014, by Cash Money Records. The mixtape features the productions from London on da Track, Issac Flame and Goose, among others and it features guest appearances from Nipsey Hussle, PeeWee Longway, Jacquees, Yung Ralph, Bloody Jay, MPA Duke and MPA Wicced. The mixtape was supported by seven promotional singles; including "Tell Em (Lies)", "Imma Ride", "Freestyle", "Soldier", "Milk Marie", "Flava" and "Givenchy".

Background
On March 11, 2014, American rappers Young Thug and Rich Homie Quan announced a joint EP to be released in the near future. Rich Homie Quan described it as "best collabo since OutKast." On September 23, 2014, Birdman described Young Thug and Rich Homie Quan's collaboration during an interview with MTV News, saying "They were already working on a project, them two, and I said, 'Let's do it together. Let me take it to the next level for y'all, 'cause I see y'all got the potential and the talent.' I just thought by them being together, it would be a stronger impact and then they still can do their solo things."

Promotional singles
On September 29, 2014, videos for the first and second promotional singles "Tell Em (Lies)" and "Imma Ride" were released ahead of the mixtape. On October 17, 2014, videos for "Freestyle" and "Soldier” were released as the third and fourth promotional singles. On October 27, 2014, Rich Gang premiered the video for the fifth promotional single, "Milk Marie", on 106 & Park. "Flava" and "Givenchy" were subsequently announced as promotional singles.

Critical reception

The mixtape received contemporaneous acclaim from music critics. Complex described Tha Tour as "one of the year's best full-length records full stop, a consistently impactful rap record destined to be an indelible artifact of 2014". HipHopDX called it "a trap-love-fest that hypnotizes you for its entirety". Rolling Stone called it a "ridiculously fun mixtape" and described Young Thug as "stretch[ing] his voice like pure nonsense in wheezy, joyful yelps", and Quan's contributions as "cold-soul verses and hooks to give the tape weight and substance". Complex also praised the production on the tape, emphasizing the contributions of London on da Track, saying that he "works a sparse atmosphere of smooth, softened pianos and empty space". Exclaim! praised it as the best rap mixtape of 2014. On Stereogums Best Albums of 2014, Tha Tour was listed at #21. 

The mixtape ranked among the best albums of the 2010s in many publications' decade-end lists. It was ranked 2nd by Noisey, 89th by Stereogum and 97th by Rolling Stone.

The mixtape has developed a legacy for the chemistry between Young Thug and Rich Homie Quan, as well as its blueprint for Atlanta trap music. In 2018, Tom Breihan of Stereogum labelled Rich Gang: Tha Tour Pt. 1 as "a classic of 2010s rap music".

Track listing

References

2014 mixtape albums
Southern hip hop albums
Birdman (rapper) albums
Cash Money Records albums
Albums produced by Mike Will Made It
Albums produced by London on da Track
Albums produced by Sonny Digital
Young Thug albums